A.E. George (22 July 1869 – 10 November 1920) was an English stage actor. He also appeared in three silent films.

He was born Albert Edward George in Castle Hill, Lincoln, Lincolnshire, England and died in London in 1920 at the age of 51.

Filmography
 Henry VIII (1911)
 Brigadier Gerard (1915)
 The Vicar of Wakefield (1916)

References

External links

1869 births
1920 deaths
People from Lincoln, England
English male silent film actors
English male stage actors
20th-century English male actors